Manak  is a village in Phagwara tehsil in Kapurthala district of Punjab State, India. The village is administrated by a Sarpanch who is an elected representative. As of the 2011 Census of India, Manak has a population of  spread over 186 households.

Transport 
Phagwara , Banga , Jalandhar , Mahilpur, Guraya, Phillaur are the nearby cities.

Nearby villages 
 Babeli
 Bhabiana
 Brahampur
 Chair
 Dhak Chair
 Dhak Manak
 Domeli (Historical village)
 Malikpur
 Sahni
 Wahid

References

External links 
  Villages in Kapurthala
 Kapurthala Villages List

Villages in Kapurthala district